St Joseph’s Industrial School, Glin was an industrial school in Glin, County Limerick, Ireland

History
The school was founded in 1872 in Sexton Street, Limerick. It moved to Glin in 1928 and operated until 1966.

Conclusions of the Ryan report

Physical abuse
The Department of Education was aware that a boys' jaw was fractured, probably by Brother Marceau (pseudonym), and that the child was hospitalized. Brother Marceau was transferred to another residential school in Tralee.

Glin was described as having a "severe, systemic regime of corporal punishment".

Sexual abuse
Two Christian Brothers, Br. Buiron and Piperel (pseudonyms) were transferred to Glin, having been investigated about sexual abuse in other industrial schools at earlier dates. The Commission described the decision to transfer them as "reckless".

Department of Education
The Department of Education was criticised for failing in its supervisory duties, protecting the institution and dismissing serious complaints.

References

Industrial schools in the Republic of Ireland
History of County Limerick
Education in County Limerick
Boys' schools in the Republic of Ireland
Educational institutions disestablished in 1966
Defunct schools in the Republic of Ireland
Violence against men in Europe